The Lower Austrian Football Association (German: Niederösterreichischer Fussballverband; NÖFV) is the umbrella organization of the football clubs of the Austrian state Lower Austria. The NÖFV was founded in 1911 and has its headquarters in Sankt Pölten.

The NÖFV is one of 8 regional organizations of the Austrian Football Association (ÖFB).

The NÖFV is provider of the Sportschule Lindabrunn.

See also
 Lower Austrian Football Cup

References

External links
 NÖFV website 

Football in Austria
Sport in Lower Austria